On 12 March 2010, the IUCN Red List of Threatened Species identified 3829 (2657 Animalia, 1172 Plantae) near threatened species, subspecies and varieties, stocks and sub-populations.

For IUCN lists of near threatened species by kingdom, see:

Animals (kingdom Animalia) — IUCN Red List near threatened species (Animalia)
Amphibians — List of near threatened amphibians
Birds — List of near threatened birds
Fish — List of near threatened fishes
Invertebrates — List of near threatened invertebrates
Arthropods — List of near threatened arthropods
Insects — List of near threatened insects
Molluscs List of near threatened molluscs
Mammals — List of near threatened mammals
Reptiles — List of near threatened reptiles
Fungi (kingdom Fungi) — IUCN Red List near threatened species (Fungi)
Plants (kingdom Plantae) — IUCN Red List near threatened species (Plantae)

See also
 IUCN Red List conservation dependent species

References
 IUCN 2009. IUCN Red List of Threatened Species. Version 2009.2. <www.iucnredlist.org>. Source of the above list (Downloaded on 12 March 2010):